Andrew Westphal (born 28 July 1994) is an English cricketer who plays for the Mexico national cricket team. He is a right-handed batsman and a right-arm medium fast bowler. He made his first-class debut for Cardiff MCCU against Glamorgan  on 1 April 2014.

In September 2019, he was named in Mexico's Twenty20 International (T20I) squad for the men's tournament at the 2019 South American Cricket Championship. He made his T20I debut for Mexico, against Argentina, on 3 October 2019.

References

External links

1994 births
Living people
English cricketers
Cardiff MCCU cricketers
Mexico Twenty20 International cricketers
Mexican cricketers